Gjergj, the Albanian name for George, may refer to:

Gjergjan, a municipality in central Albania

People with the given name
Gjergj Arianiti (1383–1462), Albanian lord who led several campaigns against the Ottoman Empire
Gjergj Schambj, a legendary hero in Bosnia and Herzegovina, Kosovo, and Albania
Gjergj Fishta (1871–1940), Albanian Franciscan friar, writer, educator, and politician
Skanderbeg (Gjergj Kastrioti; 1405–1468), Albanian nobleman and military commander who led a rebellion against the Ottoman Empire
George Thopia (died 1392), Lord of Durazzo, Republic of Albania
Gjergj Pelini (died 1463), Catholic priest and diplomat for Skanderbeg and Venice

See also

 Gjergji, a given name and surname

Albanian masculine given names